Anolis leachii, the Antigua Bank tree anole, Barbuda Bank tree anole, or panther anole, is a species of anole, a lizard in the family Dactyloidae. The species is endemic to the Caribbean.

Geographic range
A. leachii is native to Antigua and Barbuda, an island-nation in the Caribbean Lesser Antilles, where it can be found on both main islands.  It has also been introduced to Bermuda.

Description
A. leachii is a relatively large anole species.

Sympatry
A. leachii coexists with the smaller anoles A. wattsi on Antigua, and A. forresti on Barbuda.

Etymology
The specific name, leachii, is in honor of English zoologist William Elford Leach.

References

Further reading
Boulenger GA (1885). Catalogue of the Lizards in the British Museum (Natural History). Second Edition. Volume II. Iguanidæ ... London: Trustees of the British Museum (Natural History). (Taylor and Francis, printers). xiii + 497 pp. + Plates I-XXIV. (Anolis leachii, pp. 29–30).
Duméril AMC, Bibron G (1837). Erpétologie générale ou Histoire naturelle complète des Reptiles. Tome quatrième [Volume 4]. Paris: Roret. ii + 571 pp. (Anolis leachii, new species, pp. 152–156).
Schwartz A, Thomas R (1975). A Check-list of West Indian Amphibians and Reptiles. Carnegie Museum of Natural History Special Publication No. 1. Pittsburgh, Pennsylvania: Carnegie Museum of Natural History. 216 pp. (Anolis bimaculatus leachi, pp. 70–71).

External links
Anolis leachii at the Reptile Database. 

Anoles
Lizards of the Caribbean
Endemic fauna of Antigua and Barbuda
Reptiles of Antigua and Barbuda
Reptiles described in 1837
Taxa named by André Marie Constant Duméril
Taxa named by Gabriel Bibron